Lautafi Fio Selafi Joseph Purcell is a Samoan politician and former Cabinet Minister. He is a member of the Human Rights Protection Party.

Purcell was educated at Chanel College, Moamoa and St Paul's College, Auckland as well as Victoria University of Wellington in New Zealand. He subsequently worked as a prison manager, prison inspector and policy advisor for the New Zealand Department of Justice and Department of Corrections.

Purcell was first elected to the Legislative Assembly of Samoa in a 2011 by-election, and appointed Associate Minister of Agriculture and Fisheries. Following a Cabinet reshuffle in April 2014 he was appointed as the first Minister of Public Enterprises.

He was re-elected unopposed at the 2016 Samoan general election and appointed Minister of Labour, Tourism and Samoa Land Corporation, as well as retaining his Government Enterprises portfolio. Another reshuffle in June 2016 saw him lose the Tourism portfolio to Sala Fata Pinati but retain Labour, Commerce, and Government Enterprises.

He is married to public servant Lematua Gisa Fuatai Purcell.

Notes

References

Members of the Legislative Assembly of Samoa
Living people
Government ministers of Samoa
Human Rights Protection Party politicians
Year of birth missing (living people)
Victoria University of Wellington alumni
People educated at St Paul's College, Auckland